Lichenaula provisa is a moth in the family Xyloryctidae. It was described by Thomas Pennington Lucas in 1900. It is found in Australia, where it has been recorded from Queensland.

The wingspan is about 18 mm. The forewings are greyish white with fuscous specks, and markings of black and fuscous. There is a white blotch on the base having a black spot on the costa, and a black dash toward the hind inner margin, bordered by a transverse row of black dots. There is a white diffused patch covering two-fifths of the wing with an arched diffusion of the dots and splashes longitudinally through the centre to the inner margin at half. There is a line of six spots from the costa at two-fifths to the apex, becoming diffused into a fascia over the posterior three-fifths of the wing, irregularly marked with fuscous-black spots, and splashed with metallic copper. A white spur runs into this dark fascia halfway across the wing, immediately before the anal angle. There is a subterminal grey white line. The hindwings are ochreous white, with the veins grey, shaded with fuscous along the hindmargin.

Taxonomy
It was treated as a synonym of Lichenaula phloeochroa, but DNA barcoding has shown this species to be distinctly separate.

References

Lichenaula
Moths described in 1900